Naval Outlying Landing Field Mansfield was a Naval Outlying Landing Field located in Mansfield, Massachusetts operational from 1942 to 1945. It existed as an outlying field of Naval Air Station Squantum and was used by student pilots to gain flight experience on its two 2,500 foot turf runways. Today, the field operates as Mansfield Municipal Airport.

See also
List of military installations in Massachusetts

References

Airports in Bristol County, Massachusetts
Defunct airports in Massachusetts
Installations of the United States Navy in Massachusetts
Mansfield, Massachusetts
Military installations established in 1942
Military installations closed in 1945
Mansfield
Closed installations of the United States Navy
1942 establishments in Massachusetts
1945 disestablishments in Massachusetts